Aisyah Sativa Fatetani (born 14 May 2002) is an Indonesian badminton player.

Achievements

BWF International Challenge/Series (2 titles) 
Women's singles

  BWF International Challenge tournament
  BWF International Series tournament
  BWF Future Series tournament

BWF Junior International (1 runner-up) 
Girls' singles

  BWF Junior International Grand Prix tournament
  BWF Junior International Challenge tournament
  BWF Junior International Series tournament
  BWF Junior Future Series tournament

Performance timeline

National team 
 Senior level

Individual competitions

Junior level  
 Girls' singles

Senior level 
 Women's singles

References

External links 
 

2002 births
Living people
People from Banyumas Regency
Indonesian female badminton players
21st-century Indonesian women